Stanisław Herman Lem (12 September 1921 – 27 March 2006) was a Polish writer of science fiction and essays on various subjects, including philosophy, futurology, and literary criticism. Many of his science fiction stories are of satirical and humorous character. Lem's books have been translated into more than 50 languages and have sold more than 45 million copies. Worldwide, he is best known as the author of the 1961 novel Solaris. In 1976 Theodore Sturgeon wrote that Lem was the most widely read science fiction writer in the world. 

Lem is the author of the fundamental philosophical work Summa Technologiae, in which he anticipated the creation of virtual reality, artificial intelligence, and also developed the ideas of human autoevolution, the creation of artificial worlds, and many others. Lem's science fiction works explore philosophical themes through speculations on technology, the nature of intelligence, the impossibility of communication with and understanding of alien intelligence, despair about human limitations, and humanity's place in the universe. His essays and philosophical books cover these and many other topics.

Translating his works is difficult due to Lem's elaborate neologisms and idiomatic wordplay. The Polish Parliament declared 2021 Stanisław Lem Year.

Life

Early life

Lem was born in 1921 in Lwów, interwar Poland (now Lviv, Ukraine). According to his own account, he was actually born on 13 September, but the date was changed to the 12th on his birth certificate because of superstition. He was the son of Sabina née Woller (1892–1979) and Samuel Lem (1879–1954), a wealthy laryngologist and former physician in the Austro-Hungarian Army, and first cousin to Polish poet Marian Hemar (Lem's father's sister's son). In later years Lem sometimes claimed to have been raised Roman Catholic, but he went to Jewish religious lessons during his school years. He later became an atheist "for moral reasons ... the world appears to me to be put together in such a painful way that I prefer to believe that it was not created ... intentionally". In later years he would call himself both an agnostic and an atheist.

After the 1939 Soviet occupation of western Ukraine and Belarus, he was not allowed to study at Lwow Polytechnic as he wished because of his "bourgeois origin", and only due to his father's connections he was accepted to study medicine at Lwów University in 1940. During the subsequent Nazi occupation (1941–1944), Lem's Jewish family avoided placement in the Nazi Lwów Ghetto, surviving with false papers. He would later recall:

During that time, Lem earned a living as a car mechanic and welder, and occasionally stole munitions from storehouses (to which he had access as an employee of a German company) to pass them on to the Polish resistance.

In 1945, Lwow was annexed into the Soviet Ukraine, and the family, along with many other Polish citizens, was resettled to Kraków, where Lem, at his father's insistence, took up medical studies at the Jagiellonian University. He did not take his final examinations on purpose, to avoid the career of military doctor, which he suspected could have become lifelong. After receiving absolutorium (Polish term for the evidence of completion of the studies without diploma), he did an obligatory monthly work at a hospital, at a maternity ward, where he assisted at a number of childbirths and a caesarean section. Lem said that the sight of blood was one of the reasons he decided to drop medicine.

Rise to fame

Between 1948 and 1950 Lem was working as a scientific research assistant at the Jagiellonian University, and published a number of short stories, poems, reviews, etc., particularly at Tygodnik Powszechny. In 1951, he published his first book, The Astronauts (Astronauci). In 1953 he met and married (civil marriage) Barbara Leśniak, a medical student.
Their church marriage ceremony was performed in February 1954. In 1954, he published a short story anthology,  [Sesame and Other Stories] . The following year, 1955, saw the publication of another science fiction novel, The Magellanic Cloud (Obłok Magellana).

During the era of Stalinism in Poland, which had begun in the late 1940s, all published works had to be directly approved by the communist state. Thus The Astronauts was not, in fact, the first novel Lem finished, just the first that made it past the state censors. Going by the date of the finished manuscript, Lem's first book was a partly autobiographical novel Hospital of the Transfiguration (Szpital Przemienienia), finished in 1948. It would be published seven years later, in 1955, as a part of the trilogy Czas nieutracony (Time Not Lost). The experience of trying to push Czas nieutracony through the censors was one of the major reasons Lem decided to focus on the less-censored genre of science fiction. Nonetheless, most of Lem's works published in the 1950s also contain—forced upon him by the censors and editors—various elements of socialist realism as well as of the "glorious future of communism". Lem later criticized several of his early pieces as compromised by the ideological pressure.

Lem became truly productive after 1956, when the de-Stalinization period in the Soviet Union led to the "Polish October", when Poland experienced an increase in freedom of speech. Between 1956 and 1968, Lem authored seventeen books. His writing over the next three decades or so was split between science fiction and essays about science and culture.

In 1957, he published his first non-fiction, philosophical book, Dialogues, as well as a science fiction anthology, The Star Diaries (Dzienniki gwiazdowe), collecting short stories about one of his most popular characters, Ijon Tichy. 1959 saw the publication of three books: Eden, The Investigation (Śledztwo) and the short story anthology An Invasion from Aldebaran (Inwazja z Aldebarana). 1961 saw the novels: Memoirs Found in a Bathtub (Pamiętnik znaleziony w wannie), Solaris, and Return from the Stars (Powrót z gwiazd), with Solaris being among his top works. This was followed by a collection of his essays and non-fiction prose, Wejście na orbitę (1962), and a short story anthology Noc księżycowa (1963). In 1964, Lem published a large work on the border of philosophy and sociology of science and futurology, Summa Technologiae, as well as a novel, The Invincible (Niezwyciężony).

1965 saw the publication of The Cyberiad (Cyberiada) and of a short story anthology, The Hunt. 1966 is the year of Highcastle (Polish title: Wysoki Zamek), followed in 1968 by His Master's Voice (Głos Pana) and Tales of Pirx the Pilot (Opowieści o pilocie Pirxie). Highcastle was another of Lem's autobiographical works, and touched upon a theme that usually was not favored by the censors: Lem's youth in the pre-war, then-Polish, Lviv. 1968 and 1970 saw two more non-fiction treatises, The Philosophy of Chance (Filozofia przypadku) and Science Fiction and Futurology (Fantastyka i futurologia). Ijon Tichy returned in 1971's The Futurological Congress Kongres futurologiczny; in the same year Lem released a genre-mixing experiment, Doskonała próżnia, a collection of reviews of non-existent books. In 1973 a similar work, Imaginary Magnitude (Wielkość urojona), was published. In 1976, Lem published two novels: Maska (The Mask) and Katar (translated as The Chain of Chance). In 1980, he published another set of reviews of non-existent works, Prowokacja. The following year sees another Tichy novel, Wizja lokalna, and Golem XIV. Later in that decade, Lem published Pokój na Ziemi (1984) and Fiasco (1986), his last science fiction novel.

In the late 1970s and early 1980s, Lem cautiously supported the Polish dissident movement, and started publishing essays in Paris-based Kultura. In 1982, with martial law in Poland declared, Lem moved to West Berlin, where he became a fellow of the Institute for Advanced Study, Berlin (Wissenschaftskolleg zu Berlin). After that, he settled in Vienna. He returned to Poland in 1988.

Final years

From the late 1980s onwards, he tended to concentrate on philosophical texts and essays, published in Polish magazines (Tygodnik Powszechny, Odra, Przegląd, and others). They were later collected in a number of anthologies.

In early 1980s literary critic and historian Stanisław Bereś conducted a lengthy interview with Lem, which was published in book format in 1987 as Rozmowy ze Stanisławem Lemem (Conversations with Stanisław Lem). That edition was subject to censorship. A revised, complete edition was published in 2002 as Tako rzecze… Lem (Thus spoke... Lem).

In the early 1990s, Lem met with the literary critic and scholar Peter Swirski for a series of extensive interviews, published together with other critical materials and translations as A Stanislaw Lem Reader (1997). In these interviews Lem speaks about a range of issues he rarely discussed previously. The book also includes Swirski's translation of Lem's retrospective essay "Thirty Years Later", devoted to Lem's nonfictional treatise Summa Technologiae. During later interviews in 2005, Lem expressed his disappointment with the genre of science fiction, and his general pessimism regarding technical progress. He viewed the human body as unsuitable for space travel, held that information technology drowns people in a glut of low-quality information, and considered truly intelligent robots as both undesirable and impossible to construct.

Writings

Science fiction
Lem's prose shows a mastery of numerous genres and themes.

Recurring themes

One of Lem's major recurring themes, beginning from his very first novel, The Man from Mars, was the impossibility of communication between profoundly alien beings, which may have no common ground with human intelligence, and humans. The best known example is the living planetary ocean in Lem's novel Solaris. Other examples include intelligent swarms of mechanical insect-like micromachines (in The Invincible), and strangely ordered societies of more human-like beings in Fiasco and Eden, describing the failure of the first contact.

Another key recurring theme is the shortcomings of humans. In His Master's Voice, Lem describes the failure of humanity's intelligence to decipher and truly comprehend an apparent message from space. Two overlapping arcs of short stories, Fables for Robots (Bajki Robotów, translated in the collection Mortal Engines), and The Cyberiad (Cyberiada) provide a commentary on humanity in the form of a series of grotesque, humorous, fairytale-like short stories about a mechanical universe inhabited by robots (who have occasional contact with biological "slimies" and human "palefaces"). Lem also underlines the uncertainties of evolution, including that it might not progress upwards in intelligence.

Other writings
Śledztwo and Katar are crime novels (the latter without a murderer); Pamiętnik... is a psychological drama inspired by Kafka. Doskonała próżnia and Wielkość urojona are collections of reviews of and introductions to non-existent books. Similarly, Prowokacja purports to review a (non-existing) Holocaust-themed work.

Essays
Dialogs and Summa Technologiae (1964) are Lem's two most famous philosophical texts. The Summa is notable for being a unique analysis of prospective social, cybernetic, and biological advances; in this work, Lem discusses philosophical implications of technologies that were completely in the realm of science fiction at the time, but are gaining importance today—for instance, virtual reality and nanotechnology.

Views in later life
Lem's criticism of most science fiction surfaced in literary and philosophical essays Science Fiction and Futurology and interviews. In the 1990s, Lem forswore science fiction and returned to futurological prognostications, most notably those expressed in  [Blink of an Eye] .

Lem said that since the success of Solidarność, and the collapse of the Soviet empire, he felt his wild dreams about the future could no longer compare with reality.

He became increasingly critical of modern technology in his later life, criticizing inventions such as the Internet, which he said "makes it easier to hurt our neighbors."

Relationship with American science fiction

SFWA
Lem was awarded an honorary membership in the Science Fiction Writers of America (SFWA) in 1973. SFWA honorary membership is given to people who do not meet the publishing criteria for joining the regular membership, but who would be welcomed as members had their work appeared in the qualifying English-language publications. Lem never had a high opinion of American science fiction, describing it as ill-thought-out, poorly written, and interested more in making money than in ideas or new literary forms. After his eventual American publication, when he became eligible for regular membership, his honorary membership was rescinded. This formal action was interpreted by some of the SFWA members as a rebuke for his stance, and it seems that Lem interpreted it as such. Lem was invited to stay on with the organization with a regular membership, but he declined. After many members (including Ursula K. Le Guin, who quit her membership and then refused the Nebula Award for Best Novelette for The Diary of the Rose) protested against Lem's treatment by the SFWA, a member offered to pay his dues. Lem never accepted the offer.

Philip K. Dick
Lem singled out only one American science fiction writer for praise, Philip K. Dick, in a 1984 English-language anthology of his critical essays, Microworlds: Writings on Science Fiction and Fantasy. Lem had initially held a low opinion of Philip K. Dick (as he did for the bulk of American science fiction) and would later say that this was due to a limited familiarity with Dick's work, since Western literature was hard to come by in Communist Poland.

Dick alleged that Stanisław Lem was probably a false name used by a composite committee operating on orders of the Communist party to gain control over public opinion, and wrote a letter to the FBI to that effect. There were several attempts to explain Dick's act. Lem was responsible for the Polish translation of Dick's work Ubik in 1972, and when Dick felt monetarily short-changed by the publisher, he held Lem personally responsible (see Microworlds). Also it was suggested that Dick was under the influence of strong medications, including opioids, and may have experienced a "slight disconnect from reality" some time before writing the letter. A "defensive patriotism" of Dick against Lem's attacks on American science fiction may have played some role as well. Lem would later mention Philip Dick in his monograph Science Fiction and Futurology.

Significance

Writing

Lem is one of the most highly acclaimed science fiction writers, hailed by critics as equal to such classic authors as H. G. Wells and Olaf Stapledon. In 1976, Theodore Sturgeon wrote that Lem was the most widely read science fiction writer in the world. In Poland, in the 1960s and 1970s, Lem remained under the radar of mainstream critics, who dismissed him as a "mass market", low-brow, youth-oriented writer; such dismissal might have given him a form of invisibility from censorship. His works were widely translated abroad, appearing in over 40 languages. and have sold over 45 million copies. , about 1.5 million copies were sold in Poland after his death, with the annual numbers of 100,000 matching the new bestsellers.

Franz Rottensteiner, Lem's former agent abroad, had this to say about Lem's reception on international markets:

Influence
Will Wright's popular city-planning game SimCity was partly inspired by Lem's short story The Seventh Sally.

The video game Stellaris is highly inspired by his works, as its creators said at the start of 2021  (Year of Lem)

A major character in the film Planet 51, an alien Lem, was named by screenwriter Joe Stillman after Stanisław Lem. Since the film was intended to be a parody of American pulp science fiction shot in Eastern Europe, Stillman thought that it would be hilarious to hint at the writer whose works have nothing to do with little green men.

Film critics have noted the influence of Andrei Tarkovsky's cinematic adaptation of Solaris on later science fiction films such as Event Horizon (1997) and Christopher Nolan's Inception (2010).

Adaptations of Lem's works
Solaris was made into a film in 1968 by Russian director Boris Nirenburg, a film in 1972 by Russian director Andrei Tarkovsky—which won a Special Jury Prize at the Cannes Film Festival in 1972—and an American film in 2002 by Steven Soderbergh.

A number of other dramatic and musical adaptations of his work exist, such as adaptations of The Astronauts (First Spaceship on Venus, 1960) and The Magellan Nebula (Ikarie XB-1, 1963). Lem himself was, however, critical of most of the screen adaptations, with the sole exception of Przekładaniec in 1968 by Andrzej Wajda. In 2013, the Israeli–Polish co-production The Congress was released, inspired by Lem's novel The Futurological Congress.

In 2018 with the directing of György Pálfi a film adaptation of His Master's Voice was made with the same title.

Honors

Awards
 1957 – City of Kraków's Prize in Literature (Nagroda Literacka miasta Krakowa)
 1965 – Prize of the Minister of Culture and Art, 2nd Level (Nagroda Ministra Kultury i Sztuki II stopnia)
 1973
 Prize of the Minister of Foreign Affairs for popularization of Polish culture abroad (nagroda Ministra Spraw Zagranicznych za popularyzację polskiej kultury za granicą)
 Literary Prize of the Minister of Culture and Art (nagroda literacka Ministra Kultury i Sztuki) and honorary member of Science Fiction Writers of America
 1976 – State Prize 1st Level in the area of literature (Nagroda Państwowa I stopnia w dziedzinie literatury)
 1979 – Grand Prix de Littérature Policière for his novel Katar.
 1986 – Austrian State Prize for European Literature for year 1985
 1991 – Austrian literary 
 1996 – recipient of the Order of the White Eagle
 2005 – Medal for Merit to Culture – Gloria Artis (on the list of the first recipients of the newly introduced medal)

Recognition and remembrance 
 1972 – member of commission "Poland 2000" of the Polish Academy of Sciences
 1979 – a minor planet, 3836 Lem, discovered by Soviet astronomer Nikolai Stepanovich Chernykh is named after him.
 1981 – Doctor honoris causa honorary degree from the Wrocław University of Technology
 1986 – the whole issue (#40 = Volume 13, Part 3) of Science Fiction Studies was dedicated to Stanislaw Lem
 1994 – member of the Polish Academy of Learning
 1997 – honorary citizen of Kraków
 1998 – Doctor honoris causa: University of Opole, Lviv University, Jagiellonian University
 2003 – Doctor honoris causa of the University of Bielefeld
 2007 – A street in Kraków is to be named in his honour.
 2009 – A street in Wieliczka was named in his honour
 2011 – An interactive Google logo inspired by The Cyberiad was created and published in his honor for the 60th anniversary of his first published book: The Astronauts.
 2013 – two planetoids were named after Lem's literary characters:
 343000 Ijontichy, after Ijon Tichy
 343444 Halluzinelle, after Tichy's holographic companion  Halluzinelle from German TV series Ijon Tichy: Space Pilot
 Lem (satellite), a Polish optical astronomy satellite launched in 2013 as part of the Bright-star Target Explorer (BRITE) programme
 2015: Pirx (crater), a90 km (55.9 miles) wide impact crater on Pluto's natural satellite Charon, discovered in 2015 by the American New Horizons probe
 2019 – the star Solaris and its planet Pirx, after the novel Solaris and Tales of Pirx the Pilot
 In December 2020 Polish Parliament declared year of 2021 to be the Year of Stanisław Lem.
 The Museum of City Engineering, Kraków, has the Stanislaw Lem Experience Garden, an outdoor area with over 70 interactive locations where children can carry out various physical experiments in acoustics, mechanics, hydrostatics and optics. Since 2011 the Garden has been organizing out the competition "Lemoniada", inspired by the creative output of Lem.

Political views
Lem's early works were socialist realist, possibly to satisfy state censorship, and in his later years he was critical of this aspect of them. In 1982, with the onset of the martial law in Poland Lem moved to Berlin for studies and next year he moved for several years (1983–1988) to Vienna. However he never showed any wish to relocate permanently in the West. By the standards of the Eastern Bloc, Lem was financially well off for most of his life.

Lem was a critic of capitalism, totalitarianism, and of both Stalinist and Western ideologies.

Lem believed there were no absolutes; "I should wish, as do most men, that immutable truths existed, that not all would be eroded by the impact of historical time, that there were some essential propositions, be it only in the field of human values, the basic values, etc. In brief, I long for the absolute. But at the same time I am firmly convinced that there are no absolutes, that everything is historical, and that you cannot get away from history."

Lem was concerned that if the human race attained prosperity and comfort this would lead it to passiveness and degeneration.

Personal life

Lem was a polyglot: he knew Polish, Latin (from medical school), German, French, English, Russian and Ukrainian. Lem claimed that his IQ was tested at high school as 180.

Lem was married to Barbara (née Leśniak) Lem until his death. She died on 27 April 2016. Their only son, was born in 1968. He studied physics and mathematics at the University of Vienna, and graduated with a degree in physics from Princeton University. Tomasz wrote a memoir about his father, Awantury na tle powszechnego ciążenia (Tantrums on the Background of the Universal Gravitation), which contain numerous personal details about Stanisław Lem. The book jacket says  Tomasz works as a translator and has a daughter, Anna.

As of 1984, Lem's writing pattern was to get up a short time before five in the morning and start writing soon after, for 5 or 6 hours before taking a break.

Lem was an aggressive driver. He loved sweets (especially halva and chocolate-covered marzipan), and did not give them up even when, toward the end of his life, he fell ill with diabetes. In the mid-80s due to health problems he stopped smoking. Coffee often featured in Lem's writing and interviews.

Stanisław Lem died from a heart failure in the hospital of the Jagiellonian University Medical College, Kraków on 27 March 2006 at the age of 84. He was buried at Salwator Cemetery, Sector W, Row 4, grave 17.

In November 2021, Agnieszka Gajewska's biography of Lem, Holocaust and the Stars, was translated into English by Katarzyna Gucio and published by Routledge. It discussed aspects of Lem's life, such as being forced to wear the six-pointed badge and being struck for not removing his hat in the presence of Germans, as required of Jews at the time.

Lem loved movies and greatly enjoyed artistic cinema (especially the movies of Luis Buñuel. He also liked the King Kong, James Bond, Star Wars and Star Trek movies but he remained mostly displeased by movies which were based upon his own stories. The only notable exceptions are Voyage to the End of the Universe (1963) (which didn't credit Lem as writer of the original book "The Magellanic Cloud") and Layer Cake (1968) (which was based upon his short story "Do You Exist, Mr Jones?").

Bibliography 
A list of books and monographs about Stanisław Lem:

Notes

General references

Further reading

 Jameson, Fredric. "The Unknowability Thesis." In Archaeologies of the Future: This Desire Called Utopia and Other Science Fictions. London and New York: Verso, 2005.
 Suvin, Darko. "Three World Paradigms for SF: Asimov, Yefremov, Lem." Pacific Quarterly (Moana): An International Review of Arts and Ideas 4.(1979): 271–283.

External links

 , maintained by Lem's son and secretary
 forum.lem.pl, internet forum about Lem and his works
 Lemopedia, The Lem Encyclopedia wiki
 
 
 
 Stanisław Lem: Did the Holocaust Shape His Sci-Fi World? from Culture.pl

 
1921 births
2006 deaths
20th-century atheists
20th-century essayists
20th-century Polish Jews
20th-century Polish non-fiction writers
20th-century Polish novelists
20th-century Polish philosophers
20th-century Polish writers
20th-century scholars
20th-century short story writers
21st-century atheists
21st-century essayists
21st-century Polish Jews
21st-century Polish non-fiction writers
21st-century Polish novelists
21st-century Polish philosophers
21st-century Polish writers
21st-century scholars
21st-century short story writers
Anti-capitalists
Artificial intelligence ethicists
Artificial intelligence researchers
Atheist philosophers
Burials at Salwator Cemetery
Communication theorists
Crime fiction writers
Futurologists
Hyperreality theorists
Independent scholars
Jagiellonian University alumni
Jewish atheists
Jewish humorists
Jewish non-fiction writers
Jewish philosophers
Jewish Polish writers
Literacy and society theorists
Literary theorists
Mass media theorists
Neologists
People from Lwów Voivodeship
People with diabetes
Philosophers of science
Philosophers of social science
Philosophers of technology
Polish atheists
Polish essayists
Polish humorists
Polish literary critics
Polish male non-fiction writers
Polish male writers
Polish philosophers
Polish satirists
Polish sceptics
Polish science fiction writers
Polish speculative fiction critics
Princeton University alumni
Psychological fiction writers
Recipients of the Order of Polonia Restituta (1944–1989)
Recipients of the Order of the Banner of Work
Recipients of the Order of the White Eagle (Poland)
Science fiction critics
Social commentators
Social philosophers
Surrealist writers
Theorists on Western civilization
University of Lviv alumni
Writers about communism
Writers about religion and science
Writers from Kraków
Writers from Lviv